The Powerpuff Girls is a 1998 television series.

The Powerpuff Girls may also refer to:
 The Powerpuff Girls (franchise)
 The Powerpuff Girls Movie, a movie based on the 1998 television series
 Powerpuff Girls Z, a Japanese spin-off of the 1998 television series
 The Powerpuff Girls (2016 TV series), a reboot based on the 1998 television series 
 Powerpuff Girls, a live-action series based on the 1998 television series